Dimo Kostov (born 17 March 1947) is a Bulgarian former wrestler who competed in the 1976 Summer Olympics.

References

External links
 

1947 births
Living people
People from Harmanli
Olympic wrestlers of Bulgaria
Wrestlers at the 1976 Summer Olympics
Bulgarian male sport wrestlers
Olympic bronze medalists for Bulgaria
Olympic medalists in wrestling
Medalists at the 1976 Summer Olympics
Sportspeople from Haskovo Province
20th-century Bulgarian people
21st-century Bulgarian people